L'amitié is the fifth studio album by French singer-songwriter Françoise Hardy, released in November 1965 on Disques Vogue. Like many of her previous records, it was originally released without a title and came to be referred to, later on, by the name of its most popular song. The album includes several French adaptations of English-language songs, along with Hardy's own compositions.

Track listing 
Hardy is accompanied by the Charles Blackwell orchestra.  Except as noted, lyrics and music were written by her.
 "Ce petit cœur" – 2:10
 "Il se fait tard" – 1:42
 "Tout ce qu'on dit"Music written by: Tommy Brown
 "L'Amitié" – 2:23Lyrics by: Jean-Max RivièreMusic written by: Gérard Bourgeois
 "En t'attendant" – 1:46
 "Je t'aime" – 2:00Music written by: Mick Jones
 "Ce n'est pas un rêve" – 3:00Original title: "Don't Come Any Closer"Lyrics and music written by: Charles BlackwellFirst performed by Samantha Jones, 1964French adaptation by: Françoise Hardy
 "Quel mal y a-t-il à ça?" – 2:36Original title: "When I Get Through With You"Lyrics and music written by: Harlan HowardFirst performed by: Patsy Cline, 1962French adaptation by: Françoise Hardy
 "Tu peux bien" – 1:48
 "Le temps des souvenirs" – 2:31Original title: "Just Call And I'll Be There"Lyrics and music written by: Charles BlackwellFirst performed by: P.J. Proby, 1964French adaptation by: Jacques Datin and Maurice Vidalin
 "Je pensais" – 2:04
 "Dis-lui non" – 2:26Original title: "Say It Now"Lyrics and music written by: Robert Douglas SkeltonFirst performed by: Bobby Skel, 1964French adaptation by: Françoise Hardy

Editions

LP records: first editions in the English-speaking world 
 , 1966: The Warm Romantic Voice of Françoise Hardy, Disques Vogue (SVL 933.201).
 , 1966: L’Amitié, Disques Vogue (VC 6022).
 , 1966: The Warm Romantic Voice of Françoise Hardy, Disques Vogue (SVL 933.201).
 , 1966: Disques Vogue (VGL 7010).
 , 1966: Disques Vogue (VRL 3021).
 , 1966: Françoise … Françoise Hardy, 4 Corners/Kapp Records (mono FCL-4231), (stéréo FCS-4231).

Reissues on CD 
 , 1996: Disques Vogue/Sony BMG (7-43213-80052-3).
 , 16 October 2015: L'Amitié, Light in the Attic Records/Future Days Recordings (FDR 617).

Reissue on 180g Vinyl 
 , January 2016: L'Amitié, Light in the Attic Records/Future Days Recordings (FDR 617).

Reception

References 

Françoise Hardy albums
1965 albums
French-language albums
Disques Vogue albums